The 1960 United States presidential election in Ohio on November 8, was part of the 1960 United States presidential election. Voters chose 25 representatives, or electors to the Electoral College, who voted for President and Vice President.

Ohio was won by Republican Party candidate, incumbent Vice President Richard Nixon of California, with a 53.28% popular vote majority, defeating Democratic Party candidate and Massachusetts Senator John F. Kennedy, who received 46.72% of the vote.

This was the second of two elections in the 20th century in which Ohio, a historical bellwether state, voted for the losing candidate, the first being 1944 when Republican nominee Thomas E. Dewey carried the state over President Franklin D. Roosevelt. It would not do so again until it backed Donald Trump over Joe Biden in 2020.

This anomaly was due to strong anti-Catholic voting (amidst an overall nationwide pro-Democratic swing) in the Appalachia-influenced, heavily Baptist southern and western parts of the state. This was also the last time until 2020 that Ottawa County voted for the losing candidate.

Primaries

Democratic primary

Governor Michael DiSalle won the state's primary as a favorite son pledged to support Kennedy.

Ohio was one of the largest states to hold a primary, with 64 delegates to the DNC. Its primary, held on May 3, coincided with that of neighboring Indiana.

Kennedy had campaigned in Ohio numerous times in the two years prior to announcing his official candidacy. While his internal polling was positive, it also showed that he could still lose if a strong candidate launched a favorite son campaign against him. His campaign team was particularly worried about Frank Lausche launching such a challenge. In November 1959 their polling showed a race between him and Kennedy resulting in a statistical tie. Those polls showed that Kennedy would win the race a race between him and DiSalle 62 to 38%. 

In 1959, during his many visits to the state, Kennedy won the backing of Cuyahoga County Democratic Party leader, Ray T. Miller and Cleveland Mayor, Anthony J. Celebrezze. 

Kennedy felt that he could not compete in both Ohio and Wisconsin due to time limitations preventing him from being able to spend adequate time in both states.  Kennedy saw Wisconsin as providing him an opportunity to potentially deliver an early and fatal blow to Hubert Humphrey's campaign.  Thus, he chose to compete there instead of in Ohio.

Kennedy felt that he needed to secure DiSalle's endorsement ahead of declaring his candidacy in order to demonstrate appeal outside of New England.  Thus, in December 1959, Kennedy and DiSalle brokered an agreement in which DiSalle would run as a favorite son committed to Kennedy, and would endorse Kennedy and announce his intention to run as a favorite son to assist his candidacy in a January 6 press announcement, four days after Kennedy's formal announcement of his candidacy. 

DiSalle won with a wide margin against Albert S. Porter.

Republican primary

Nixon carried the state's Republican primary.

Results

Results by county

See also
 United States presidential elections in Ohio

References

Ohio
1960
1960 Ohio elections